Perișoru is a commune in Călărași County, Muntenia, Romania. It is composed of three villages: Mărculești-Gară, Perișoru and Tudor Vladimirescu.

As of 2007 the population of Perișoru is 5,380.

References

Communes in Călărași County
Localities in Muntenia